Othón Cuevas Córdova (2 July 1965 – 28 December 2020) was a Mexican politician affiliated with the Party of the Democratic Revolution.

Biography
As of 2014 he served as Deputy of the LX Legislature of the Mexican Congress representing Oaxaca.

He died of COVID-19 at age 55, during the COVID-19 pandemic in Mexico, five days after the death of his mother, also caused by the same illness.

References

1965 births
2020 deaths
Politicians from Oaxaca
Party of the Democratic Revolution politicians
21st-century Mexican politicians
Deaths from the COVID-19 pandemic in Mexico
Universidad del Valle de Atemajac alumni
Members of the Chamber of Deputies (Mexico) for Oaxaca